The Fijian gold Pacific Sovereign is a 24-karat, bullion, one-ounce gold coin of .9999 purity minted by the New Zealand Mint (first released mid-2009) in commemoration of the islands of Fiji, a sovereign nation and member (albeit a suspended member as of 2006) of the Commonwealth of Nations.

Specifications

External links 
 

Gold bullion coins